Symmoca deserticolella is a moth in the family Autostichidae. It was described by Turati in 1924. It is found in Libya.

References

Moths described in 1924
Symmoca